Carolus Johannes Reinecke was the rector of the Potchefstroom University for Christian Higher Education, situated in Potchefstroom, South Africa.

Roots
Reinecke was born on 21 December 1941, in Krugersdorp, South Africa. He was the son of Carolus Johannes Reinecke and Cornelia Marthina van Dyk.  He passed standard 10 (grade 12) at Piet Potgieter High in Potgietersrus, Northern Transvaal. (His father was the principal) He married Hendriena Fransina  Venter, daughter of Abraham Adriaan Venter and Hester Snyman.

Education
He obtained the following degrees at the Potchefstroom University: BSc (Physics and Chemistry), BSc Hon (Chemistry) and a MSc (Chemistry). He then completed his PhD (in Bio-chemistry) at Leiden University, the Netherlands.  He was appointed as Head of The Bio-Chemistry department of his alma mater, and in 1983 became Dean of the Natural and Agricultural Sciences Faculty of that university.

Rector

After being Vice-rector from 1985 to 1988, he was appointed as rector in 1988. He was rector until 2002.

Notable happenings during his term as rector
Under his leadership the university dealt with and approved:
In 1990 the hostels were opened to all races.
 NEHAWU and MESHAWU (Metal and Electrical Workers Union of South Africa),both trade unions, were recognized.
Madoda Shadrock Zibi, was the first black vice-rector appointed
In 1999 the Potchefstroom Educational College was taken over by the university, a decision taken by the government of the day
He had a programme running with Universiteit Twente a Dutch University, regarding quality control for educational institutions.  The research division: Center for Higher Education Policy Studies (CHEPS) help him with his university's education quality control.

Publications
(Afrikaans) Reaksiekinetiese ondersoek van die ontbinding van kaliumtrioksalatokobaltaat in ‘n oplossing (translated: Reaction kinetic investigation regarding the dissolution of potassium trioxalate cobaltate in a solution )
Protein synthesis in vitro directed by bacteriophage and plant viral RNA.

References 

South African academic administrators
Leiden University alumni
Academic staff of Leiden University
People from Krugersdorp
1941 births
Living people
Academic staff of North-West University
Members of the Academy of Science of South Africa